Appearance and Reality (1893; second edition 1897) is a book by the English philosopher Francis Herbert Bradley, in which the author, influenced by Georg Wilhelm Friedrich Hegel, argues that most things are appearances and attempts to describe the reality these appearances misrepresent, which Bradley calls the Absolute. It is the main statement of Bradley's metaphysics and is considered his most important book. The work was an early influence on Bertrand Russell, who, however, later rejected Bradley's views.

Overview
The work is divided into two books; the first being “Appearance,” and the second being “Reality.” In “Appearance,” Bradley arms himself with a single weapon—the Law of Non-Contradiction —and proceeds to lead the reader through a pilgrim’s progress of argumentation; wherein he exposes contradictions, inconsistencies, and paradoxes embedded deep in the heart of our everyday experiences that we take prima facie to be unquestionably and absolutely real. Among the condemned include primary and secondary qualities, the distinction between an object and its properties, internal and external relations, space and time, motion and change, causality and activity, individual things and the self, the body and soul, physical nature and matter, judgment and absolute truth, thoughts and things, and many other phenomena that caught in his snare. Bradley even goes so far as to say that “philosophy, as we shall find in our next chapter, is itself but appearance.” For Bradley, these phenomena are all “appearances” that fail to live up to the status of “Ultimate Reality.”

After entering into the second book of Appearance and Reality, Bradley exchanges his heavily-used battering-ram for an eidetic canvas and paintbrush, and proceeds to draft a portrait of reality. Bradley does indeed recognize that “appearances” exist, nay they are essential to reality; “Appearance without reality would be impossible, for what then could appear?  And reality without appearance would be nothing, for there is nothing outside appearances.” For reality is its appearances and appearances are adjectival to reality.  Bradley stresses that every appearance is most certainly real; however, they are real only in a relative sense and only in a matter of degree. Nothing is outside of reality, for it must swallow everything; indeed “whatever is rejected as appearance is, for that very reason, no mere nonentity.  It cannot bodily be shelved and merely got rid of, and, therefore, since it must fall somewhere, it must belong to reality…For reality must own and cannot be less than appearance.” Bradley calls his “Ultimate Reality,” the “Absolute.” Bradley’s Absolute is a harmonious, supra-relational whole whose contents is nothing other than sentient experience.  Bradley’s arguments for monism stem from his rejection of the reality of relations.  In fact, Bradley’s legacy has largely been shaped by his notorious and eponymously named “Bradley’s Regress” argument. In essence, Bradley attacks the notion that we can treat an object, its properties, and its relations, as independent—such as a lump of sugar and the property of “whiteness,” to use Bradley’s example.  One of these infamous arguments against "external relations" runs as follows:“Let us abstain from making the relation an attribute of the related, and let us make it more or less independent. ‘There is a relation C, in which A and B stand; and it appears with both of them.’ But here again we have made no progress. The relation C has been admitted different from A and B, and no longer is predicated of them. Something, however, seems to be said of this relation C, and said again, of A and B. And this something is not to be the ascription of one to the other. If so, it would appear to be another relation D, in which C, on one side, and, on the other side, A and B stand. But such a makeshift leads at once to the infinite process.”This argument was subject to a great deal of criticism at the time of its publication.  However, Bradley himself was so convinced of its soundness that, after another chapter where he tackles internal relations, he takes a step back from his demolition of every and all relation in the universe and says:“The reader who has followed and has grasped the principle of this chapter, will have little need to spend his time upon those which succeed it.  He will have seen that our experience where relational, is not true; and he will have condemned almost without a hearing the great deal mass of phenomena.”The destructive force of Bradley’s arguments against a “great deal mass of phenomena” were complemented by several arguments serving as ammunition for his Idealistic reconstruction of reality.  As it was said before, Bradley did not hold that “consciousness” or “thought” to be the stuff of which reality was made. Indeed, Bradley shoveled consciousness, minds, bodies, thoughts, souls, and selves into the pot of appearances. Reality, for him, was, and could not be anything other than, sentient experience—which he took to be the ground of consciousness.  In the most dramatic passage of Appearance and Reality, Bradley calls upon the reader to perform the following ideal experiment:“Find any piece of existence, take up anything that anyone could possibly call a fact, or could in any sense assert to have being, and then judge if it does not consist in sentient experience. Try to discover any sense in which you can still continue to speak of it, when all perception and feeling have been removed; or point out any fragment of its matter, any aspect of its being, which is not derived from and is not still relative to this source. When the experiment is made strictly, I can myself conceive of nothing else than the experienced. Anything, in no sense felt or perceived, becomes to me quite unmeaning. And as I cannot try to think of it without realising either that I am not thinking at all, or that I am thinking of it against my will as being experienced, I am driven to the conclusion that for me experience is the same as reality. The fact that falls elsewhere seems, in my mind, to be a mere word and a failure, or else an attempt at self-contradiction. It is a vicious abstraction whose existence is meaningless nonsense, and is therefore not possible.”This “experiment,” like his argument against the reality of relations, was also subject to severe attack.  The radical conclusions of Bradley’s arguments for existence monism and a single “Absolute” that transcends, absorbs, and harmonizes all the finite and contradictory appearances of our universe, with all its suns and galaxies, earned him the title of “the Zeno of modern philosophy.” Yet, Bradley’s trenchant prose, humorous wit, and frequent polemics against empiricism, materialism, reductionism, and abstractionism blend together into an iconic and unique flavor of thought.

Reception
Appearance and Reality is considered Bradley's most important book. According to Ronald W. Clark, its publication helped to "wrest the philosophical initiative from the Continent." In 1894, the book was reviewed by J. M. E. McTaggart in Revue de métaphysique et de morale and Josiah Royce in The Philosophical Review. The book was an early influence on Bertrand Russell, encouraging him to question contemporary dogmas and beliefs. Russell recalled that Appearance and Reality had a profound appeal not only to him but to most of his contemporaries, and that the philosopher George Stout had stated that Bradley "had done as much as is humanly possible in ontology." While Russell later rejected Bradley's views, he continued to regard Appearance and Reality with "the greatest respect".

The philosopher Richard Wollheim comments that the second edition of Appearance and Reality contains considerable new material, and should be consulted in preference to the original edition. According to the British philosopher Timothy Sprigge, some of Bradley's arguments are famous. Sprigge suggests that Bradley's absolute idealism in some respects received a better presentation in Bradley's subsequent work Essays on Truth and Reality (1914) than in Appearance and Reality.  Thomas Mautner comments that Bradley's "bold metaphysics" is presented with "pugnacious verve".

References

Bibliography
Books

 
 
 
 
 
 

1893 non-fiction books
Books by F. H. Bradley
English-language books
Metaphysics books